Thomasia cognata is a species of flowering plant in the family Malvaceae and is endemic to the south-west of Western Australia. It is a compact, multi-stemmed shrub with wrinkled, narrowly oblong to elliptic leaves and pale pink flowers.

Description
The edges of the leaves are wavy, the surfaces covered with a few star-shaped hairs.

Taxonomy and naming
Thomasia cognata was first formally described in 1845 by Ernst Gottlieb von Steudel in Lehmann's Plantae Preissianae from specimens collected on Rottnest Island in 1839. The specific epithet (cognata) means "related by birth", referring to its similarity to other species.

Distribution and habitat
This thomasia grows on coastal limestone and sand dunes from near the Murchison River and south to Albany, then east to the east of Esperance in the Esperance Plains, Geraldton Sandplains, Jarrah Forest, Swan Coastal Plain and Warren bioregions of south-western Western Australia.

Conservation status
Thomasia cognata is classified as "not threatened" by the Western Australian Government Department of Biodiversity, Conservation and Attractions.

References

Rosids of Western Australia
Plants described in 1845
cognata
Taxa named by Ernst Gottlieb von Steudel